Walter Carey (also spelt 'Cary') FRS (17 October 1685 – 27 April 1757), of West Sheen, Surrey, was a British administrator and politician who sat in the House of Commons for 35 years from 1722 to 1757.

Carey was the eldest son of Walter Carey of Everton, Bedfordshire and his wife Annabella Halford, daughter of Sir William Halford. He matriculated at New College, Oxford on 14 December 1704, aged 18 and was awarded B.A. in 1708, and created M.A. on 15 September 1730. He succeeded his father in 1714.

Cary was an extraordinary Clerk of the Privy Council from 1717 to 1729 and Clerk of the Privy Council in ordinary from 1729 to his death. He was surveyor general to the Prince of Wales (1723–25), Warden of the Mint (1725–27) and a Lord of Trade (1727–30).

He was a Member of Parliament in the Parliament of Great Britain for Helston from 1722 to 1727 and for Dartmouth from 1727 to 1757. He was also a Member of the Parliament of Ireland for Clogher from 1731 to 1757 and Chief Secretary to the Duke of Dorset as Lord Lieutenant of Ireland from 1730 to 1737.

In 1727 he was elected a Fellow of the Royal Society. He was a Clerk of the Green Cloth from 1738 to his death.

Carey died in 1757. He had married twice: firstly Elizabeth, the daughter of Anthony Sturt, MP, of London and widow of John Jeffreys, MP and secondly Elizabeth, the daughter and coheiress of Anthony Collins of Baddow Hall, Essex. He had no children of his own with either wife.

References

1685 births
1757 deaths
Irish MPs 1727–1760
Chief Secretaries for Ireland
Members of the Parliament of Great Britain for constituencies in Cornwall
British MPs 1722–1727
British MPs 1727–1734
British MPs 1734–1741
British MPs 1741–1747
British MPs 1747–1754
British MPs 1754–1761
Fellows of the Royal Society
Members of the Parliament of Ireland (pre-1801) for County Tyrone constituencies
Members of the Parliament of the United Kingdom for Dartmouth